Nuvem is a town that is part of the Salcete sub-district of South Goa district, Goa, India.

Geography 
Nuvem is situated along the National Highway 17. Its neighbouring villages include Verna, Majorda, and Seraulim. It is located 5 km from its district headquarters Margão, 24 km from Vasco da Gama, and 29 km from the state capital Panjim.

Demographics 
Nuvem is a census town in the district of South Goa, Goa. It has population of 9,288, of which 4,450 are males and 4,838 are females, as per a report released by the Census India 2011.

Education 
Nuvem is home to two educational institutions: Carmel College for Women and IAM Institute of Hotel Management.

Government and politics
Nuvem is part of Nuvem (Goa Assembly constituency) and South Goa (Lok Sabha constituency).

Culture 
Football is the most popular sport in Nuvem. Konkani tiatrs are also very popular. Nuvem has a go-kart track located on the hill top. A new sporting activity called MILSIM GOA, a variation of paintball, has just started in Gounlloy, a ward in Nuvem. It also has a water park called Froggyland.

Nuvem has a church known as Jezu Marie Juze (Jesus, Mary and Joseph), formerly known as Igreja Mãe dos Pobres or Mother of the Poor Church. The Mãe dos Pobres feast is celebrated by the villagers on the first Sunday of November every year.

References

Cities and towns in South Goa district